El Golf is an underground metro station on the Line 1 of the Santiago Metro, in Santiago, Chile. It is located in El Golf neighborhood, close to the building that serves as the seat of local government for Las Condes. The station was opened on 22 August 1980 as part of the extension of the line from Salvador to Escuela Militar.

A work of art by Rodolfo Opazo is installed on the walls of the station.

The station is undergoing renovation work to replace the original wall covering. The work was scheduled to be completed in February 2012.

References

Santiago Metro stations
Railway stations opened in 1980
1980 establishments in Chile
Santiago Metro Line 1